Friendship Christian School is a private K-12 Christian school located in Wilson County, Tennessee, near Lebanon.

2009-2010 School Administration
Elementary School Principal - Kristi Chaffin
Middle and High School Principal - Veronica Bender
Admissions Director- Kimberly Tune

External links
 School website

Christian schools in Tennessee
Schools in Wilson County, Tennessee
Private K-12 schools in Tennessee
Lebanon, Tennessee